Mirè Reinstorf (born 5 June 2002) is a South African track and field athlete who specializes in the pole vault. She was the gold medallist at the World Athletics U20 Championships in 2021.

Achievements
All information taken from World Athletics profile.

National titles
 South African Athletics Championships
 Pole vault: 2019, 2021, 2022

  Championships
 Pole vault: 2021, 2022

 South African U20 Championships
 Pole vault: 2021

 South African U18 Championships
 Pole vault: 2019

References

External links 
 

2002 births
Living people
South African female pole vaulters
World Athletics U20 Championships winners
African Championships in Athletics winners
South African Athletics Championships winners